The 2004 Angola Men's Basketball Super Cup (11th edition) was contested by Primeiro de Agosto, as the 2003 league champion and Interclube, the 2003 cup runner-up. Primeiro de Agosto was the winner, making it is's 4th title.

The 2004 Angola Women's Basketball Super Cup (9th edition) was contested by Primeiro de Agosto, as the 2003 league champion and Interclube, the 2003 cup runner-up. Primeiro de Agosto was the winner, making it is's 4th title.

2004 Men's Super Cup

2004 Women's Super Cup

See also
 2004 Angola Basketball Cup
 2004 BAI Basket

References

Angola Basketball Super Cup seasons
Super Cup